Nyahururu (formerly known as Thomson's Falls) is a town in Kenya, lying north east of Nakuru. The town derives its name from the Maasai word e-naiwurruwurr, meaning waterfall and/or windy or place of storms. It is allegedly located in Laikipia County. Despite this, Nyahururu formerly  functioned as the administrative capital of Nyandarua County, before it became a county, until the headquarters was shifted to Ol Kalou. There have been calls for a reversal.  The town has an urban population of 36,450. The town still continues to be a central economic power of the immediate former district of Nyandarua. For that reason, the town has strong economic ties to the two counties.

History
Nyahururu was founded as Thomson's Falls, being named after the  high Thomson's Falls on Ewaso Narok river, a tributary of the Ewaso Nyiro River, which drains from the Aberdare mountain ranges.  It is on the Junction of Ol Kalou-Rumuruti road and the Nyeri-Nakuru road. Settlers were more interested in the rich lands of the neighboring environments. Lord Maurice Egerton had the largest allocation of land neighboring the town. The town grew around a railway from Gilgil opened in 1929 (now effectively abandoned). The town was once an important player in the timber milling industry, and the now defunct National Pencil Company had a factory there. It is also an important milk processing hub.

Economy and people
The region around Nyahururu is mainly agricultural.  To the North Ol Ngarua is famous for its maize, while Shamata to the south is a major producer of potatoes. Lately, flower farming has brought new life to Nyahururu.  Suera Flowers is a pioneer in this venture.  The cool temperate weather, land availability and cheap labor may be some of the attractions to flower farming.

The town is also a commercial centre. It has many supermarkets such as Spears and Mugo supermarkets. Large banks in Kenya also have their branches situated in the town. Some of the banks in Nyahururu town are Barclays Bank, Equity, Kenya Commercial Bank (KCB), Cooperative Bank, Family Bank, Faulu Kenya and Kenya Women Microfinance Bank Limited.

The town has a number of hotels, including The Panari Resort, Kawa Falls Hotel, Laikipia Comfort Hotel, and Thompson Falls Lodge Hotel.

The town heavily relies on the transport industry. There are major highways linking the town to cities such as Nairobi, Nakuru and Nyeri. Most of these roads are now in good condition, and properly paved.

Nyahururu is also frequented by marathon and cross-country runners for practicing before major events due to its high altitude.

Samuel Wanjirŭ, the Olympic Marathon Record holder and the first Kenyan to win the Marathon at the Olympics, called Nyahururu home until his death on May 16, 2011. Other notables from Nyahururu are Bedan Karoki, John Ngŭgĭ and Godffrey Gitahi Kariuki.

Education
Laikipia University has two campuses, one in Nakuru, and the other on the outskirts of Nyahururu town. The town also has some colleges, the most prominent being The Kenya Institute of Management. It also has several highly sought-after private schools. Some of the large private schools within Nyahururu Town are Nyahururu Highway Schools, Busara Forest View Academy and Nyahururu Elite Schools. Large public schools include Nyandarua Boarding Primary School, District Education Board, Bishop Louis Ngarenarok, Ndururumo High School, Nyahururu Boys High School, and Ndururi High School.

The Pan African School of Theology, an evangelical theological college founded in 2006, is located near the town. Another Bible school is the Emmanuel Bible Institute. The Institute offers diplomas and certificates in theology.

Religion
Nyahururu is predominantly Christian, with Catholic and  Protestant churches. Redeemed Gospel Church is one of the major Pentecostal Churches with its Regional Headquarters in town and many other branches in the outskirts.

Incidents
In 2010, Nyahururu was the site of an internationally reported incident in which police rescued a woman who was under threat of lynching after she shoplifted two Bibles from a supermarket.

In September, 2008, residents of the town were shocked to see a blanket of hail resembling snow covering their land following a thunderstorm. "I have not seen such a thing ever since I was born," said one surprised resident of Nyahururu. Cold weather kept the hailstones from melting quickly, as hail usually does in western Kenya.

See also 
 List of cities and towns in Kenya by population

References

External links 

 Nyahururu Town

Populated places in Laikipia County